Wilfred John Simkin  (15 June 1883  – 8 July 1967) was the 6th Anglican Bishop of Auckland whose episcopate spanned a 20-year period during the middle of the 20th century. Born in Staffordshire he was educated at The Prince of Wales School, Rugeley and Lichfield Theological College before embarking on an ecclesiastical career with a curacy at  Christ Church, Stafford. Emigrating to New Zealand in 1911 he was successively Vicar of Wairoa, Private Chaplain to the Bishop of Waiapu and Archdeacon of Hawkes Bay/Manukau before appointment to the See of Auckland in 1940. He was consecrated bishop on 11 June 1940. An enigmatic man, he worked tirelessly to complete the building of Holy Trinity Cathedral.

In the 1965 Queen's Birthday Honours, Simkin was appointed a Companion of the Order of St Michael and St George, for services to the community.

References

1883 births
People from Rugeley
Anglican archdeacons in New Zealand
Anglican bishops of Auckland
English emigrants to New Zealand
New Zealand Companions of the Order of St Michael and St George
1965 deaths
20th-century Anglican bishops in New Zealand
Alumni of Lichfield Theological College